The 1995 season was São Paulo's 66th season since club's existence.

Statistics

Scorers

Overall

{|class="wikitable"
|-
|Games played || 86 (36 Campeonato Paulista, 7 Copa do Brasil, 23 Campeonato Brasileiro, 6 Supercopa Libertadores, 14 Friendly match)
|-
|Games won || 39 (17 Campeonato Paulista, 3 Copa do Brasil, 9  Campeonato Brasileiro, 4 Supercopa Libertadores, 6 Friendly match)
|-
|Games drawn || 24 (10 Campeonato Paulista, 3 Copa do Brasil, 6 Campeonato Brasileiro, 0 Supercopa Libertadores, 5 Friendly match)
|-
|Games lost || 23 (9 Campeonato Paulista, 1 Copa do Brasil, 8 Campeonato Brasileiro, 2 Supercopa Libertadores, 3 Friendly match)
|-
|Goals scored || 116
|-
|Goals conceded || 89
|-
|Goal difference || +26
|-
|Best result || 4–1 (H) v Novorizontino – Campeonato Paulista – 1995.02.044–1 (A) v Náutico – Copa do Brasil – 1995.03.144–1 (H) v Ponte Preta – Campeonato Paulista – 1995.04.20
|-
|Worst result || 1–4 (A) v Werder Bremen – Friendly match – 1995.08.07
|-
|Most appearances || 
|-
|Top scorer || Bentinho (22)
|-

Friendlies

Trofeo Achille e Cesare Bortolotti

Torneio Rei Dadá

Copa dos Campeões Mundiais

Official competitions

Campeonato Paulista

Matches

Record

Copa do Brasil

Record

Campeonato Brasileiro

First round
 Chave B

Matches

Second round
 Chave B

Matches

Record

Supercopa Sudamericana

Record

References

External links
official website 

Sao Paulo
São Paulo FC seasons